Plexippus tsholotsho is a species of jumping spider in the genus Plexippus that lives in South Africa and Zimbabwe and was first described by Wanda Wesołowska in 2011.

References

Salticidae
Arthropods of Zimbabwe
Spiders of South Africa
Spiders described in 2011
Taxa named by Wanda Wesołowska